The 48th World Cup season began on 26 October 2013, in Sölden, Austria, and concluded on 16 March 2014 at the World Cup finals in Lenzerheide, Switzerland. The defending overall champions from the 2013 season were Marcel Hirscher of Austria and Tina Maze of Slovenia. The overall titles were won by Hirscher and Anna Fenninger, also of Austria. The season was interrupted by the 2014 Winter Olympics that took place from 7 to 23 February in Sochi, Russia, with the alpine events at Rosa Khutor.

Summary
The men's title was won by Hirscher for the third time in a row, becoming the first man to achieve this since Phil Mahre in 1983. Hirscher secured the title after the second-to-last race of the season when he beat Aksel Lund Svindal of Norway, who did not compete in slalom. Svindal won both the downhill (second time in a row) and super-G titles (third time in a row). The giant slalom title went to Ted Ligety of the United States. Ligety and Hirscher shared the same number of points but Ligety had more victories (4, as opposed to 2 by Hirscher). This was Ligety's second consecutive giant slalom title and fifth overall. The slalom title went to Hirscher, who secured it in the last race of the season. The combined title was shared by Ligety and Alexis Pinturault of France, who each won a first and a second place in two combined races of the season. 

Fenninger won the overall women's title, her first, and the first by an Austrian woman since Nicole Hosp in 2007. It was the first time since 2002 that both overall titles were won by Ausrians. Fenninger secured the title at the super-G finals in Lenzerheide after her closest competitor, Maria Höfl-Riesch of Germany, suffered an injury a day earlier in the downhill  which ended her season. At the end of the season, Höfl-Riesch announced her retirement from the World Cup circuit. Höfl-Riesch won the downhill title, Lara Gut of Switzerland won the super-G title and also most races of the season (seven, followed by five of Mikaela Shiffrin of the United States, who also won the slalom title). The giant slalom title went to Fenninger who secured it in the last race. There was only one combined event in the 2014 season, which was won by Marie-Michèle Gagnon, who therefore also won the combined title. Maze of Slovenia, the 2013 overall champion, was less successful this year compared to her record-breaking 2013 season. She won one race and four more podiums and finished fourth in the final standings. However, she stated that her main goal in the season were the Sochi Olympics, where she won two gold medals, in downhill and in giant slalom. Tina Weirather of Liechtenstein was another strong performer, holding a second place before the Olympics, but suffered an injury in downhill training in Sochi and had to skip the rest of the season, finishing fifth overall. Returning from a knee injury at the 2013 World Championships, four-time overall champion Lindsey Vonn of the U.S. appeared in only four races, all speed events in December 2013.

Calendar

Men

Ladies

Nation team event

Men's standings

Overall 

† - Athletes finished the race, but didn't take points as they completed over 108% of the winner's total race time.

Downhill

Super-G

Giant slalom

Slalom

Super combined 

Source:

Ladies' standings

Overall

Downhill

Super-G

Giant slalom

Slalom

Super combined 

Source:

Nations Cup

Overall

Men

Ladies 

source:

Footnotes

References

External links 
FIS-ski.com: Alpine skiing, FIS World Cup
FIS Alpine.com

 
FIS Alpine Ski World Cup
World Cup
World Cup